Łubiana  is a village in the administrative district of Gmina Kościerzyna, within Kościerzyna County, Pomeranian Voivodeship, in northern Poland. It is located within the ethnocultural region of Kashubia in the historic region of Pomerania.

The village has an approximate population of 2,500.

Łubiana was a royal village of the Polish Crown, administratively located in the Tczew County in the Pomeranian Voivodeship.

During the German occupation of Poland (World War II), Łubiana was one of the sites of executions of Poles, carried out by the Germans in 1939 as part of the Intelligenzaktion.

The Catholic church of Saint Maximilian Kolbe is located in Łubiana.

Sports
The local football club is Ceramik Łubiana. It competes in the lower leagues.

Transport
There is a train station in the village.

References

Villages in Kościerzyna County